The Téméraire was a ship of the line of the French Navy.

She was built in Brest in 1669 as Ardent, and launched in 1671 as Téméraire.

She took part in the campaign in Sicilia in 1676, in the Battle of Bévézier (10 July 1690) and the Battle of Barfleur (29 May 1692). She also took part in the Battle of Lagos.

She was sunk by the English frigate HMS Montagu on 9 December 1694.

Ships of the line of the French Navy
1670s ships